The King Salmon River is a small stream on the northern tip of Admiralty Island of Southeast Alaska, United States.

Its entire course lies within Kootznoowoo Wilderness of the Admiralty Island National Monument.

A relatively small river, it is not navigable.  Besides its namesake king salmon, the river hosts a large annual run of pink salmon.

See also
List of rivers of Alaska

References

Rivers of Hoonah–Angoon Census Area, Alaska
Rivers of Alaska
Rivers of Unorganized Borough, Alaska